A Maritime Safety and Security Team, or MSST, is a counter-terrorism team of the United States Coast Guard established to protect local maritime assets. It is also a harbor and inshore patrol and security team that includes detecting and, if necessary, stopping or arresting submerged divers, using the Underwater Port Security System. It is the only special force that can arrest submerged divers.

MSSTs were created under the Maritime Transportation Security Act of 2002 (MTSA) in direct response to the terrorist attacks on September 11, 2001, and they are a part of the United States Department of Homeland Security's layered strategy directed at protecting seaports and waterways. MSSTs provide waterborne and a modest level of shore-side counter-terrorism force protection for strategic shipping, high interest vessels, and critical infrastructure. MSSTs are a quick response force capable of rapid nationwide deployment via air, ground or sea transportation in response to changing threat conditions and evolving Maritime Homeland Security (MHS) mission requirements. Multi-mission capability facilitates augmentation for other selected Coast Guard missions.

MSST personnel receive training in Advanced Tactical Boat Operations and counter-terrorism force protection at the Joint Maritime Training Center at Camp Lejeune, North Carolina.

The MSSTs operate as part of the Coast Guard's Deployable Operations Group (DOG); now called Deployable Specialized Forces (DSF), they are under operational control of the Coast Guard's corresponding Pacific and Atlantic Area commands, as well as an active reserve component of the White House on request.

Mission

Modeled after the Port Security Unit (PSU) and Law Enforcement Detachment (LEDET) programs, MSSTs provide a complementary non-redundant capability designed to close critical security gaps in United States strategic seaports. MSSTs are staffed to support continuous law enforcement operations both ashore and afloat. In addition, MSSTs: 
 Jointly staffed to maximize effectiveness executing Port, Waterways, and Coastal Security (PWCS) operations (enforce security zones, port state control boarding, protection of military out-loads and major marine events, augment shore-side security at waterfront facilities, detect WMD weapons/agents, and participate in port level counter-terrorism exercises).
 Provide enhanced port safety and security and law enforcement capabilities to the economic or military significant port where they are based.
 Deploy in support of National Special Security Events (NSSEs) requiring Coast Guard presence, such as OpSail, Olympics, Republican and Democratic national conventions, major disasters or storm recovery operations.
 Prototype/employ specialized capabilities to enhance mission performance (K-9 program, radiation detectors, dive program, vertical insertion, running gear entangling systems, less-than-lethal weapons, etc.).
 Deploy on board cutters and other naval vessels for port safety and security, drug law enforcement, migrant interdiction, or other maritime homeland security mission requirements.
 Support Naval Coastal Warfare requirements during Homeland Defense (HLD) and in accordance with long standing agreements with DOD and the Combatant Commanders (protect strategic shipping, major naval combatants and critical infrastructure at home and abroad)

Capabilities

Maritime interdiction and law enforcement
Counter-terrorism/Force Protection
Visit, Board, Search and Seizure
CBRN-E Detection
Search and Rescue (limited)
Port Protection/Anti-sabotage
Underwater Port Security
Canine Handling Teams (Explosive detection)
Tactical Boat Operations
Non-compliant boarding operations

Commissioning schedule
MSST 91101 -- Seattle (Established 2002)
MSST 91102 -- Chesapeake, Va. (Established 2002.  Merged with TACLET North in 2004 to form the prototype Enhanced Maritime Safety and Security Team - "EMSST" which, in 2006, was finally named the Maritime Security Response Team - "MSRT;" the Coast Guard's only high-risk/counter-terrorism unit)
MSST 91103 -- Los Angeles/Long Beach (Established 2002)
MSST 91104 -- Houston/Galveston (Established 2002)
MSST 91105 -- San Francisco (Established 2003)
MSST 91106 -- Fort Wadsworth, Staten Island, NY (Established 2003)
MSST 91107 -- Honolulu, HI (Established 2005)
MSST 91108 -- St. Marys, Georgia (Naval Submarine Base Kings Bay) (Established 2003)
MSST 91109 -- San Diego, CA (Established 2005) (transitioned into MSRT West in 2016, the Coast Guard' 2nd high-risk/counter-terrorism unit, also parent command of all Coast Guard dive lockers)
MSST 91110 -- Cape Cod, MA (Boston Established 2003 relocation in 2018)
MSST 91111 -- Anchorage, Alaska (Established 2004) (Disassembled 2011)
MSST 91112 -- New Orleans (Established 2004)
MSST 91114 -- Miami, FL (Established 2005)

Personnel

Each MSST has active duty personnel.

See also 
Law Enforcement Detachments
Port Security Unit

References

External links

Maritime Safety and Security Team 91104's web page
Maritime Safety and Security Team 91114's web page
ShadowSpear Special Operations: Maritime Security Response Team

United States Coast Guard
Maritime safety
Deployable Operations Group
Counterterrorist organizations